The 1977 Annandale and Eskdale District Council election was part of the 1977 Scottish local elections. This was the second election held under the new double-tiered system of the Local Government (Scotland) Act 1973. Annandale and Eskdale is an area of Dumfries and Galloway and was covered by the Annandale and Eskdale District Council and the Dumfries and Galloway Regional Council.

As with the last election, political parties didn't field any candidates in this election.

Results by Ward

References

Annandale
Dumfries and Galloway Council elections